The FIRM (stylized as The FIRM) is a brand of exercise videos and equipment currently owned by Gaiam. The original "The FIRM" videos are best known for popularizing a hybrid of aerobic exercise and weight training.

History 
In 1979, Anna Benson founded the exercise studio The Body Firm (later The FIRM Studios) in Charleston and Columbia, South Carolina. She recruited her sister Cynthia Benson and husband Mark Henriksen under the Meridian Films label to co-produce a series of exercise videos filmed there between 1986 and 1994. It quickly established itself as a competitor to personalities like Jane Fonda.

A lawsuit brought against Meridian Films in 2001 over royalties forced The FIRM to be sold to GoodTimes Entertainment. Gaiam purchased GoodTimes in 2005 and subsequently expanded The FIRM, focusing on women's fitness.

Anna Benson started Fitness Favorites, which became the official online store for the original videos after her death in 2009. After her death, Anna's son became owner of the Classic The FIRM and has released Anna's 'classic' DVDs from VHS format. The FIRM Studios was renamed The Flex Body/The FLEX  in 2015 and is owned by Emily Welsh. In 2018, Anna Benson's Fitness Favorites renamed The FIRM (classic) to Anna L. Benson's The Body Firm. Now, Fitness Favorites is also streaming workouts.

References

External links 
 
 Fitness Favorites
https://www.goodreads.com/book/show/1352574.Firm_for_Life

Exercise organizations
Aerobic exercise
1979 establishments in South Carolina
Exercise-related trademarks